Thomas Hauff is an Austrian-born Canadian actor. He is most noted for his performance in the 1979 film Summer's Children, for which he received a Genie Award nomination for Best Actor at the 1st Genie Awards in 1980.

Predominantly a stage actor, his noted theatre roles have included Jack MacNeill in Margaret Hollingsworth's War Babies, Bram Shipley in James Nichol's stage adaptation of Margaret Laurence's The Stone Angel, MacDonald in Anne Chislett's Glengarry School Days, Matthew Cuthbert in Paul Ledoux's adaptation of Lucy Maud Montgomery's Anne of Green Gables, Lord Capulet in Romeo and Juliet, and Angus in Michael Healey's The Drawer Boy.

He also had roles in the films Brethren, Who Has Seen the Wind, Silence of the North, The Climb, Cowboys Don't Cry and Away from Her.

Filmography

Film

Television

References

External links

Canadian male film actors
Canadian male television actors
Canadian male stage actors
Canadian male Shakespearean actors
Austrian emigrants to Canada
Living people
Year of birth missing (living people)